Villa North Historic District is a national historic district located at Bluffton, Wells County, Indiana.  The district encompasses 24 contributing buildings in an exclusively residential section of Bluffton.  It developed between about 1891 and 1915 and includes representative examples of Queen Anne, Colonial Revival, and Bungalow / American Craftsman style architecture. Notable contributing houses include the Lent Williamson Residence (Longfields, 1891), Amos King Residence (1894), Peter Beeler Residence (1899), and Wiley Messick Residence (c. 1915).

It was listed on the National Register of Historic Places in 1985.

References

Historic districts on the National Register of Historic Places in Indiana
Houses on the National Register of Historic Places in Indiana
Queen Anne architecture in Indiana
Colonial Revival architecture in Indiana
Bungalow architecture in Indiana
Buildings and structures in Wells County, Indiana
National Register of Historic Places in Wells County, Indiana